Abu Ishaq al-Kubunani (d. after 886/1481), was a Persian mathematician, astronomer and man of letters. He was active from 845 to 886 AH. He studied in a school named Sa'die and then became a teacher in that same school. It appears that he lived in Sari for a long time and local rulers of Tabaristan patronized him, as he wrote some of his works in Tabaristan and offered them to the rulers of Tabaristan. He was well-versed in Persian and Arabic literature and some of his poems are preserved in his works such as Mansha'at (منشآت) and even on his mathematical works. His works are in both Persian and Arabic.

References

Further reading
 

15th-century Iranian mathematicians
People from Kerman
15th-century Iranian astronomers
People from Kerman Province
Astronomers of the medieval Islamic world